Somebody's Daughter is a 1992 television film starring Nicollette Sheridan, Nick Mancuso, Boyd Kestner, Michael Cavanaugh, Max Gail and Richard Lineback. It was directed by Joseph Sargent and written by Lauren Currier.

Plot
Sara, a dancer and stripper, finds herself repeatedly in danger after witnessing a murder.

References

External links

1992 films
1992 crime drama films
Films directed by Joseph Sargent
Films scored by Charles Bernstein
American drama television films
American crime drama films
1990s American films
1990s English-language films
English-language drama films